Orrell Park railway station is a railway station in Orrell Park, Liverpool, England. The station was opened in 1906 by the Lancashire and Yorkshire Railway, and was originally named Orrell Park Halt; this was simplified to Orrell Park by British Rail. It is located to the north of the city centre. It also serves the nearby district of Orrell. It is on the Ormskirk branch of the Merseyrail network's Northern Line.

Orrell Park is the most convenient station for the Walton Vale shopping area.

Facilities
As with most Merseyrail stations, it has a ticket office that is fully staffed from start of service until after the last train has left (closing shortly after midnight).  There is also a ticket machine available.  There is a refreshment vending machine provided and waiting shelters on each platform, with train running information provided by automated announcements and digital display screens.  The ramps to the platform and the footbridge both have steps, but there is a lift available for disabled passengers.

Services
Trains operate every 15 minutes (Monday to Saturday daytime) between Ormskirk and Liverpool Central, and every 30 minutes at other times.

Gallery

References

External links

Railway stations in Liverpool
DfT Category E stations
Former Lancashire and Yorkshire Railway stations
Railway stations served by Merseyrail
Railway stations in Great Britain opened in 1906